Rosie Flores is an American singer, songwriter and musician. Her discography consists of 13 studio albums, 2 compilations, and 9 singles. In addition, she has been featured as a performer and composer on numerous albums by other artists.

Albums

Compilations

Singles

Music videos

Primary artist/contributor

1985 - 1999
 1985: various artists - A Town South of Bakersfield (Enigma) - track 1, "Heartbreak Train" (with Albert Lee)
 1988: various artists - A Christmas Tradition, Volume II (Warner Bros.) - track 1, "Rockin' Around the Christmas Tree"
 1992: various artists - Cause (Piece Of Mind) - track 10, "Lucky Lady" - spoken word performance
 1993: various artists - Rig Rock Deluxe (A Musical Salute To The American Truck Driver) (Upstart) - track 16, "Six Days on the Road"
 1993: various artists - Absolutt Beat Vol.1 (Absolutt Gratis) (Beat) - track 17, "Love And Danger" (with Joe Ely)
 1994: various artists - Tulare Dust : A Songwriter's Tribute To Merle Haggard (Hightone) - track 7, "My Own Kind Of Hat"
 1995: various artists - South by Southwest Live Vol.3 (SXSW) - track 4, "Tumblin' Down"
 1996: various artists - Mixx on the Fly - Live from Studio A WCBE Vol. 4 (WCBE) - track 8, "Cryin Over You"

2000 - present
 2000: various artists - Seka ["Sister"] Vol. 2 (Twah!) - track 6, "We'll Survive"
 2002: Jon Langford and the Pine Valley Cosmonauts - The Executioner's Last Songs Volume 1 (Bloodshot) - track 2, "I'll Never Get Out Of This World Alive"
 2002: various artists - KGSR Broadcasts Vol. 10 (KGSR) - track 2-16, "Ballad of the Sun and the Moon" (with Alejandro Escovedo)
 2002: various artists - The Bottle Let Me Down: Songs for Bumpy Wagon Rides (Bloodshot) - track 1, "Red, Red Robin"
 2002: various artists - Dressed in Black: A Tribute to Johnny Cash (Dualtone) - track 10, "Big River"
 2003: various artists - Light Of Day: A Tribute To Bruce Springsteen (Schoolhouse) - track 2-07, "Lucky Town"
 2004: various artists - Hard-Headed Woman: A Celebration of Wanda Jackson (Bloodshot) - track 10, "In The Middle Of A Heartache"- track 2-07. "Lucky Town"
 2004: various artists - Por Vida: A Tribute to the Songs of Alejandro Escovedo (Or Music) - track 2-07, "Inside This Dance"
 2011: various artists - This One's for Him: A Tribute to Guy Clark (Icehouse) - track 1-08, "Baby Took A Limo To Memphis"
 2014: various artists - Rockin' Legends Pay Tribute to Jack White (Cleopatra) - track 10, "Blunderbuss"

As composer
 1984: ¡Screamin' Sirens! - ¡Fiesta! (Enigma) - track 2, "Maniac"; track 6, "Midnight To Moonlight"
 1985: various artists - The Enigma Variations (Enigma) - track 1, "Maniac"
 2007: Lucky Tomblin - Red Hot from Blue Rock (Texas World) - track 5, "Don't Forget to Dip the Girl"
 2009: Rick Shea - Shelter Valley Blues - (Tres Pescadores) - track 7, "Sweet Little Pocha" (co-written with Rick Shea)
 2010: Patricia Vonne - Worth It (Measured) - track 2, "Cut From The Same Cloth"
 2011: David Wood - Country (Dew Note) - track 4, "Following a Full Moon" (co-written with Alan Laney and Bill C. Graham)
 2012: Cathy Faber - Rattle My Cage (self-released) - track 5, "Honky-Tonk Moon"
 2013: Patricia Vonne - Rattle My Cage (Bandolera) - track 5, "This Cat's In The Doghouse"
 2015: Stephen R. Cheney - "I'm Just Lucky" (Capitol Records|Capitol / Universal) - track 16, "Midnight to Moonlight" (co-written with James Intveld)

As producer
 2012: Janis Martin - The Blanco Sessions (Cow Island)

Also appears on

1984 - 1999
 1979: Juice Newton - Take Heart (Capitol) - vocals
 1984: ¡Screamin' Sirens! - ¡Fiesta! (Enigma) - guitar, vocals
 1988: Joe Ely - Dig All Night (HighTone / Shout!) - vocals
 1990: Jann Browne - Tell Me Why (Curb) - vocals
 1991: Marshall Crenshaw - Life's Too Short (MCA) - vocals
 1991: Will T. Massey - Will T. Massey (MCA) - vocals
 1992: Tom Russell - Box of Visions (Philo) - vocals
 1994: Dave Alvin - King of California (Hightone) - vocals on track 4, "Goodbye Again"
 1994: Midnight To Six - Tighten Up! (Fun Key) - vocals
 1996: Country Dick Montana - The Devil Lied To Me (Bar/None) - lead guitar, vocals
 1996: Bob Neuwirth - Look Up (Watermelon) - vocals
 1996: Texas Tornados - 4 Aces (Reprise) - vocals on track 12, "The One I Love The Most"
 1997: Terry Clarke - The Heart Sings (Transatlantic) - vocals on track 4, "Back to the Well"
 1998: Howe Gelb - Hisser (V2) - vocals on track 21, "Cracklin' Water"
 1998: The Wandering Eyes - Sing Songs of Forbidden Love (Lazy S.O.B.) - vocals

2000 - present
 2002: Alejandro Escovedo - By the Hand of The Father (Texas Music Group) - vocals on track 5, "Ballad of the Sun and the Moon"
 2003: Wanda Jackson - Heart Trouble (Sympathy for the Record Industry) - vocals
 2004: Gin Palace Jesters - Honkytonk Fools (Rhythm Bomb) - vocals on track 5, "Lover Not A Fighter"
 2006: Dave Insley - Here with You Tonight (self-released) - vocals, duet
 2006: Charlie Louvin - Echoes of the Louvin Brothers (Varèse Sarabande) - vocals
 2006: Spicewood Seven - Kakistocracy (Austin)- vocals
 2007:  - The Moonshine Sessions (¡Ya Basta!) - vocals on track 10, "Pretty Vacant"
 2008: Katy Moffatt - Playin' Fool: Live In Holland (Strictly Music) - vocals, guest artist
 2009: Tish Hinojosa - Our Little Planet (Varèse Sarabande) - vocals on track 5, "We Mostly Feel That Way"

References

External links 
 
 
 

Discographies of American artists
Rock music discographies
Country music discographies